Manocha is a village in Mozambique.

Manocha may also refer to:

 Dinesh Manocha, American computer scientist
 Ajit Manocha, president and CEO of SEMI
 Inder Manocha (born 1968), British Asian stand-up comedian and actor